Yoo Jin-ryong is a South Korean politician who formerly served as the Minister of Culture.

Life and career

Yoo Jin-ryong was born on September 2, 1956 in Incheon. In 1979, he graduated from Seoul National University with a bachelor's degree in Commerce and Trade, followed by a master's degree in Public Administration from Hanyang University a few years later.

On February 13, 2013, Yoo Jin Ryong was appointed as South Korea's Minister of Culture. Yoo resigned from the post in July 2014 after he clashed with President Park over staffing issues.

References

1956 births
Living people
Culture ministers
Government ministers of South Korea